Tabernaemontana longipes is a tropical tree found in Colombia, Venezuela, Ecuador, Nicaragua, Panama, and Costa Rica.  Its unusually shaped pods inspired the common name Dutchman's shoes.  Its oval leaves are about 13 cm long and glabrous.  The flowers are white.

References

Trees of Central America
Trees of South America
Plants described in 1897
longipes